The Jellies! is an American adult animated sitcom created by Tyler, the Creator and Lionel Boyce for Cartoon Network's late-night programming block Adult Swim. The show was revamped from a series of the same name which was previously featured exclusively on Tyler's Golf Media app. It premiered on Adult Swim on October 22, 2017. The animation is produced by Augenblick Studios, and was renewed for a second season in October 2018.  The second season premiered on May 19, 2019.

On August 17, 2021, voice actor Earl Skakel announced that Adult Swim cancelled the show after two seasons.

Plot
The show follows a family of anthropomorphic jellyfish and their 16-year-old human son Cornell. When the boy learns he was adopted at birth, he is shocked, and subsequently spirals out of control in an attempt to "find himself." As a result, he and his family and friends wind up in what the network bills as "uncanny situations."

Cast
Phil LaMarr as Cornell Jelly 
Earl Skakel as Barry Jelly
AJ Johnson as Debbie Jelly
Blake Anderson as RG
Kevin Michael Richardson as Reggie
Kilo Kish as KY Jelly
Tyler, The Creator as various (also producer)
Jasper Dolphin as various
Lionel Boyce (also known as LasBoy) as various
Taco Bennett as various

Episodes

Series overview

Web series (2015)
The series premiered as a web series on the Golf Media app and released new episodes every Sunday in October 2015. There are a few differences between the web series and the Adult Swim series such as Cornell's race (Caucasian in the Golf Media version; African-American in the Adult Swim version).

Season 1 (2017)

Season 2 (2019)

References

External links
 

2010s American adult animated television series
2010s American black cartoons
2017 American television series debuts
2019 American television series endings
2010s American black sitcoms
American adult animated comedy television series
American animated sitcoms
American flash adult animated television series
English-language television shows
Adult Swim original programming
Animated television series about dysfunctional families
Animated television series about fish
Television series by Williams Street
Television shows set in Washington (state)
Tyler, the Creator